Aoraia aspina is a species of moth of the family Hepialidae. It was described by John S. Dugdale in 1994 from specimens collected in the Tasman, Otago and Southland districts. It is endemic to New Zealand.

The wingspan is 46–53 mm for males. Females are brachypterous. The colour pattern of the forewings is ash-white on chocolate brown. The hindwings are variable, from nearly as dark as the forewings to yellowish buff. Adults are on wing from February to April.

References

Link to Dugdale catalogue is dead

Moths described in 1994
Hepialidae
Moths of New Zealand
Endemic fauna of New Zealand
Endemic moths of New Zealand